Ludwig Preiß (25 July 1910 – 14 May 1996) was a German politician of the Christian Democratic Union (CDU) and former member of the German Bundestag.

Career
Preiß was a member of the German Bundestag from its first election in 1949 to 1961 and again from 24 November 1964, when he succeeded the late Heinrich von Brentano, until 1972. In 1949 and 1953 he represented the FDP, in 1957 the DP and again in 1965 the CDU in the constituency of Marburg. In 1969 he entered the Bundestag via the state list of the Hessian CDU.

Literature

References

1910 births
1996 deaths
Members of the Bundestag for Hesse
Members of the Bundestag 1969–1972
Members of the Bundestag 1965–1969
Members of the Bundestag 1961–1965
Members of the Bundestag 1957–1961
Members of the Bundestag 1953–1957
Members of the Bundestag 1949–1953
Members of the Bundestag for the Christian Democratic Union of Germany
Members of the Bundestag for the Free Democratic Party (Germany)
Members of the Bundestag for the German Party (1947)
People from Hesse-Nassau
People from Marburg-Biedenkopf